The 1817 Santiago del Estero earthquake took place in the province of Santiago del Estero, Argentina, on 4 July at about 05:30 PM. It was estimated to be 7.0 on the Richter magnitude scale.

The earthquake was felt with grade VIII in the Mercalli intensity scale in the provincial capital Santiago del Estero, where it caused grave damage.

References
  Instituto Nacional de Prevención Sísmica. Listado de Terremotos Históricos.

1817
Geography of Santiago del Estero Province
Santiago del Estero, 1817
1817 in Argentina
July 1817 events
1817 disasters in Argentina